Det Udom is a district (amphoe) in the southern part of Ubon Ratchathani province, in northeastern Thailand.

Geography
Neighboring districts are (from the northwest clockwise) Samrong, Warin Chamrap, Na Yia, Phibun Mangsahan, Buntharik, Na Chaluai, Nam Yuen, Nam Khun, Thung Si Udom of Ubon Ratchathani Province, and Benchalak of Sisaket province

Administration
The district is divided into 16 sub-districts (tambons), which are further subdivided into 229 villages (mubans). Mueang Det is a town (thesaban mueang) covering parts of the same-named tambon. There are also three townships (thesaban tambons): Na Suang and Bua Ngam each cover parts of the same-named tambon, and Kut Prathai covers tambon Kut Prathai. There are a further 10 tambon administrative organizations (TAO).

Missing numbers are tambons which now form Districts Na Yia and Thung Si Udom.

Det Udom